Mark Andrew Bocek (born October 24, 1981) is a Canadian retired mixed martial artist who competed in the Lightweight division of the Ultimate Fighting Championship. A professional competitor for ten years from 2004 to 2014, Bocek has also formerly competed for King of the Cage.

Mixed martial arts career

Background
Bocek holds a Brazilian jiu-jitsu black belt and has been studying the art for two decades. He first studied under Rickson and Renzo Gracie and then moved on to Nova Uniao, where he received his black belt through Joao Roque in December 2003, making him the first Canadian-born black belt in Brazilian jiu-jitsu. Bocek currently trains in BJJ with Marcelo Garcia and also holds a black belt in Kempo Karate.

Ultimate Fighting Championship
Bocek caught the attention of the UFC when president Dana White and UFC owner Lorenzo Fertitta began training Brazilian jiu-jitsu under his tutelage.

In his UFC debut at UFC 73, Bocek lost to future UFC Lightweight Champion Frankie Edgar via first round TKO.

After rebounding at UFC 79 with a decision win over Doug Evans, Bocek lost to TUF winner Mac Danzig by submission in the third round.

He fought against Alvin Robinson at UFC 91 on November 16, 2008 and won by submission. His next fight was against David Bielkheden at UFC 97, where he dominated Bielkheden and submitted him by rear naked choke in the first round.

He was expected to face Matt Veach on December 5, 2009 at The Ultimate Fighter 10 Finale until Veach stepped up to fight Frank Edgar as Kurt Pellegrino's replacement. Bocek then fought UFC newcomer Joe Brammer on the same card. He defeated Brammer via first round submission.

Bocek lost a unanimous decision in a close fight to Jim Miller on March 27, 2010 at UFC 111. Despite controlling Miller's position throughout most of the contest and taking him down on multiple occasions, all three judges scored the fight 29-28 for Miller.

Bocek defeated Dustin Hazelett via first round submission on December 11, 2010 at UFC 124.

Bocek faced former WEC Lightweight Champion Benson Henderson on April 30, 2011 at UFC 129.  He lost the fight via unanimous decision.

Bocek faced Nik Lentz on December 10, 2011 at UFC 140. He won the fight via unanimous decision after taking down and controlling Lentz all three rounds.

Bocek was expected to face Matt Wiman on April 21, 2012 at UFC 145. However, Wiman was forced from the bout with an injury and was replaced by returning UFC veteran John Alessio. He won via unanimous decision (30-27, 29-28, 30-27).

Bocek faced Rafael dos Anjos on November 17, 2012 at UFC 154. He lost the fight via unanimous decision.

Bocek was expected to fight Michel Prazeres on September 21, 2013 at UFC 165. However, Bocek pulled out due to an injury and was replaced by UFC newcomer Jesse Ronson.

Bocek was expected to face Evan Dunham on April 16, 2014 at The Ultimate Fighter: Nations Finale. However, Dunham pulled out of the bout in the week leading up to the event with an undisclosed injury and was replaced by promotional newcomer Mike De La Torre. Bocek won the fight via split decision.

On August 5, 2014, Bocek announced his retirement from mixed martial arts competition via Twitter.

Personal life
Bocek is a big fan of the Czech rapper Marpo and he uses Marpo songs as his entrance music to his UFC fights.

Championships and achievements
Ultimate Fighting Championship
Submission of the Night (Two time)

Mixed martial arts record

|-
| Win
|align=center| 12–5
| Mike De La Torre
| Decision (split)
| The Ultimate Fighter Nations Finale: Bisping vs. Kennedy
| 
|align=center|3
|align=center|5:00 
|Quebec City, Quebec, Canada
|
|-
| Loss
|align=center| 11–5
| Rafael dos Anjos
| Decision (unanimous)
| UFC 154
| 
|align=center|3
|align=center|5:00
|Montreal, Quebec, Canada
|
|-
| Win
|align=center| 11–4
| John Alessio
| Decision (unanimous)
| UFC 145
| 
|align=center|3
|align=center|5:00
|Atlanta, Georgia, United States
|
|-
| Win
|align=center| 10–4
| Nik Lentz
| Decision (unanimous)
| UFC 140
| 
|align=center|3
|align=center|5:00
|Toronto, Ontario, Canada
|
|-
| Loss
|align=center| 9–4
| Benson Henderson
| Decision (unanimous)
| UFC 129
| 
|align=center| 3
|align=center| 5:00
|Toronto, Ontario, Canada
| 
|-
| Win
|align=center| 9–3
| Dustin Hazelett
| Submission (triangle armbar)
| UFC 124
| 
|align=center| 1
|align=center| 2:33
|Montreal, Quebec, Canada
| 
|-
| Loss
|align=center| 8–3
| Jim Miller
| Decision (unanimous)
| UFC 111
| 
|align=center| 3
|align=center| 5:00
|Newark, New Jersey, United States
| 
|-
| Win
|align=center| 8–2
| Joe Brammer
| Submission (standing rear-naked choke)
| The Ultimate Fighter: Heavyweights Finale
| 
|align=center| 1
|align=center| 3:36
|Las Vegas, Nevada, United States
| 
|-
| Win
|align=center| 7–2
| David Bielkheden
| Submission (rear-naked choke)
| UFC 97
| 
|align=center| 1
|align=center| 4:57
|Montreal, Quebec, Canada
| 
|-
| Win
|align=center| 6–2
| Alvin Robinson
| Submission (rear-naked choke)
| UFC 91
| 
|align=center| 3
|align=center| 3:16
|Las Vegas, Nevada, United States
| 
|-
| Loss
|align=center| 5–2
| Mac Danzig
| Submission (rear-naked choke)
| UFC 83
| 
|align=center| 3
|align=center| 3:48
|Montreal, Quebec, Canada
| 
|-
| Win
|align=center| 5–1
| Doug Evans
| Decision (unanimous)
| UFC 79
| 
|align=center| 3
|align=center| 5:00
|Las Vegas, Nevada, United States
| 
|-
| Loss
|align=center| 4–1
| Frankie Edgar
| TKO (punches)
| UFC 73
| 
|align=center| 1
|align=center| 4:55
|Sacramento, California, United States
| 
|-
| Win
|align=center| 4–0
| Garret Davis
| Submission (rear-naked choke)
| KOTC: Capital Chaos
| 
|align=center| 1
|align=center| 2:35
|Hull, Quebec, Canada
| 
|-
| Win
|align=center| 3–0
| John Mahlow
| Submission (armbar)
| KOTC: Freedom Fight
| 
|align=center| 1
|align=center| 4:09
|Gatineau, Quebec, Canada
| 
|-
| Win
|align=center| 2–0
| Kevin Manderson
| Submission (rear-naked choke)
| APEX: A Night Of Champions
| 
|align=center| 1
|align=center| 1:25
|Gatineau, Quebec, Canada
| 
|-
| Win
|align=center| 1–0
| Mark Colangelo
| TKO (injury)
| TKO 15: Unstoppable
| 
|align=center| 1
|align=center| 5:00
|Montreal, Quebec, Canada
|

References

External links

Official UFC Profile

1981 births
Canadian male mixed martial artists
Lightweight mixed martial artists
Mixed martial artists utilizing American Kenpo
Mixed martial artists utilizing Brazilian jiu-jitsu
Ultimate Fighting Championship male fighters
Living people
Sportspeople from Toronto
Canadian male karateka
Canadian practitioners of Brazilian jiu-jitsu
People awarded a black belt in Brazilian jiu-jitsu
Canadian people of Czech descent